Lawrence E. "Jap" Haskell (c. 1899 – 1964) was an American university administrator, baseball coach, and football coach. He served as the head baseball coach at the University of Oklahoma from 1927 to 1941. During his tenure, the Sooners won 176 games and eight conference championships. In the military, Haskell was a Lieutenant Commander in the United States Navy during World War II.

Haskell was the University of Oklahoma athletic director from 1941 to 1947. The Board of Regents fired him on March 25, 1947 after university president George L. Cross discovered a $60,000 deficit and $6,000 of unknown expenditures in the athletic department budget. The misappropriation was during head football coach Jim Tatum's one-year tenure at Oklahoma.

He was listed as a scout for the Boston Red Sox of Major League Baseball in 1948.

References

External links

Year of birth uncertain
1964 deaths
Boston Red Sox scouts
Oklahoma Sooners athletic directors
Oklahoma Sooners baseball coaches
Oklahoma Sooners football coaches